Francois "Frans" Botha (born 28 September 1968) is a South African former professional boxer and kickboxer. He competed in boxing from 1990 to 2014, and is perhaps best known for winning the IBF heavyweight title against Axel Schulz in 1995, but was later stripped after failing a drug test. He later challenged twice for world heavyweight titles in 2000 and 2002. Botha has competed against former Heavyweight Champions Mike Tyson, Wladimir Klitschko, Lennox Lewis, Michael Moorer and Evander Holyfield late in their respective careers. Botha participated once in mixed martial arts in 2004.

Boxing career

Early career
Botha had a victory in 1995 against Germany's Axel Schulz to win the IBF heavyweight Championship, but later tested positive for the steroid nandrolone he and his camp claimed to be prescribed by a doctor for an arm injury. The result of the fight was then changed to a "No Contest" and the IBF do not recognize Botha as former champion, although Botha was introduced as a former champ in every single professional boxing contest he has engaged in since.

In 1996 "The White Buffalo" bounced back with a courageous effort with Michael Moorer for the IBF crown on the undercard of Mike Tyson's first contest with Evander Holyfield. Moorer suffered a TKO in the twelfth round. This eventually led to fights with Mike Tyson, Shannon Briggs, and heavyweight title showdowns with Lennox Lewis and Wladimir Klitschko. Botha came up on the short end via knockout in both of those encounters for the heavyweight title.

Four months after the Klitschko fight, Botha fought contender Clifford Etienne, and knocked him down twice, but was denied a victory and received a majority draw with two judges scoring it 94–94 and one judge scoring it 95–93 in favor of Botha. This was in Etienne's hometown.

Comeback
In July 2007, Botha returned to boxing with a unanimous decision victory over Bob Mirovic in a fight held in South Africa. Botha dominated the fight with two judges holding Botha won all twelve rounds and one judge ruling he won ten of twelve. The bout was for the interim WBF World Heavyweight title.

On 6 February 2009, Botha beat Ron "Rocky" Guerrero by unanimous decision for the vacant WBF heavyweight title in South Africa. He successfully defended his WBF title against Timo Hoffmann on 15 May 2009 in Germany, winning the fight by split decision.

Botha was scheduled to box Joey Abell on 27 March 2010 (postponed from the earlier date of 16 January 2010) at the Uganda Nelson Mandela Memorial Stadium in Kampala, Uganda. On 10 January, the World Boxing Foundation executive has decided to vacate the WBF World Heavyweight Title due to Botha not defending within the agreed time limit.

On 10 April 2010 Botha lost via knockout in the 8th round to Evander Holyfield at the Thomas and Mack Center in Las Vegas, Nevada. Holyfield won the WBF heavyweight title for his victory.

Since then, Botha has won against former undefeated South African prospect Flo Simba. He then fought Michael Grant for the vacant WBF heavyweight title and was leading on the scorecards when he was knocked out with a long right hand from Grant with seconds remaining in the contest. Two fights later, Botha fought Francesco Pianeta, who was undefeated in 29 fights, losing the 10 round bout on points.

He was due to fight New Zealand dual-international Sonny Bill Williams in Brisbane on 24 November 2012. However, the fight was cancelled and moved to February. Finally the Williams fight did take place in Brisbane. However, only 10 out of a publicised 12 rounds were fought. Bout judges awarded the fight to the New Zealand Champion on points. Since that night in Brisbane there has been a lot of talk in the media, ranging from a failed drugs test, to no drugs testing at all, no WBA official present at the bout, and one fight judge stated that the first he heard about the fight being 10 rounds was from the arena announcer. However, despite all the media speculation, the WBA has confirmed that the fight was legitimate and Williams the recognised International heavyweight title-holder. Botha is hoping for a possible rematch against Williams in Cape Town.

Kickboxing and mixed martial arts career
From 2003 to 2006 Botha participated several times in the kickboxing combat sport, K-1. His current K-1 record is 4-11, with two wins coming against K-1/Kickboxing legends Jérôme Le Banner and Peter Aerts. Botha's final K-1 match was a three-round decision loss to Jorgen Kruth on 20 May 2006 in a K-1 superfight in Stockholm, Sweden.

Botha also had one mixed martial arts fight. On 31 December 2004 he lost to Yoshihiro Akiyama via an armbar submission in the first round.

On 14 October, Botha beat Espedito Da Silva by KO at K-1 Rules Africa Bomba-Yaa 2006.

Botha made a return to kickboxing in 2008. On 30 March 2008, Botha defeated muay thai kickboxer Kaoklai Kaennorsing at The KHAN in Seoul, Korea by decision. He lost to French kickboxer "Le Gentleman" Gregory Tony at WFC 6 on 27 September 2008 in Bulgaria.

Professional boxing record

Kickboxing record

Mixed martial arts record

|-
|Loss
|align=center|0–1
|Yoshihiro Akiyama
|Submission (armbar)
|K-1 PREMIUM 2004 Dynamite!!
|
|align=center|1
|align=center|1:54
|Osaka, Japan
|
|-

References

External links

Profile at K-1

1968 births
Living people
People from Witbank
Afrikaner people
Heavyweight boxers
South African male kickboxers
Heavyweight kickboxers
South African male mixed martial artists
Heavyweight mixed martial artists
Mixed martial artists utilizing boxing
Doping cases in boxing
South African sportspeople in doping cases
South African male boxers
Kunlun Fight kickboxers